Xiha is a genus of trematodes in the family Haploporidae.

Species
Xiha fastigata (Thatcher & Sparks, 1958) Andres, Curran, Fayton, Pulis & Overstreet, 2015
Xiha fragilis (Fernández Bargiela, 1987) Andres, Curran, Fayton, Pulis & Overstreet, 2015

References

Further reading
Blasco-Costa, I., Montero, F., Balbuena, J., Raga, J. & Kostadinova, A. (2009). A revision of the Haploporinae Nicoll, 1914 (Digenea: Haploporidae) from mullets (Mugilidae): Dicrogaster Looss, 1902 and Forticulcita Overstreet, 1982. Systematic Parasitology, 72(3), 187–206.

Digenea genera
Haploporidae